The 2017–18 Presbyterian Blue Hose men's basketball team represented Presbyterian College during the 2017–18 NCAA Division I men's basketball season. The Blue Hose, led by first-year head coach Dustin Kerns, played their home games at the Templeton Physical Education Center in Clinton, South Carolina as members of the Big South Conference. They finished the season 11–21, 4–14 in Big South play to finish in ninth place. They lost in the first round of the Big South tournament to Charleston Southern.

Previous season
The Blue Hose finished the season 5–25, 1–17 in Big South play to finish in last place. They lost in the first round of the Big South tournament to Campbell.

Head coach Gregg Nibert resigned on April 12, 2017 after 28 seasons at Presbyterian, and was replaced by Wofford assistant Dustin Kerns on May 22.

Roster

Schedule and results

|-
!colspan=9 style=| Non-conference regular season

|-
!colspan=9 style=| Big South regular season

|-
!colspan=9 style=| Big South tournament

References

Presbyterian Blue Hose men's basketball seasons
Presbyterian